Meri Doli Tere Angana was a Hindi TV serial that aired on Zee TV, based on the concept of a struggle of a woman who is totally committed and believes in herself. It's her strength that will stand by her through the difficult times. Produced by Rahul Bhat and Sharika Sharma Bhat under their home production banner Filmtonic Entertainment (Pvt) Ltd.

Plot
The serial is based on a girl named Simran, an orphan who has been brought up by her aunt and uncle. They are everything to her, therefore she believes that whatever they choose for her will be for the best. When Simran goes for an arranged marriage, she marries Ruhaan, who belongs to one of the wealthiest families in the city. However, on the day of her marriage, Ruhaan reveals that he loves someone else. This brings Simran at a crossroads where she can't go back to her house because her uncle is a cardiac patient, nor she can move forward with what Ruhaan told her.

Like a traditional Indian woman, Simran decides to abide by her responsibilities as a wife, daughter and daughter-in-law of Ruhaan's prestigious Oberoi family. She decides to fight against the shadow of her husband's past and get her husband back. When Ruhaan and Simran go to Goa for their honeymoon, he learns that the girl he loves is married to someone else. Now, he tries to change and starts having feelings for Simran. After a few very predictable misunderstandings, Simran and Ruhaan are reunited. Suhana, Ruhaan's former love, returns and tries to win him back. She conspires against Simran to make Ruhaan's family hate her but after a while, her plans are exposed. Suhana, in a fit of rage, shoots at Simran and Ruhaan, who stumbles off a cliff. Unfortunately, Simran dies but Ruhaan is saved by a girl named Sargam (the new protagonist), who takes him to her home. However, Ruhaan has lost his memory and does not remember anything about Simran or his past.

Ruhaan starts living with this new family. Sargam will marry Vedant, her childhood friend, but begins to grow feelings for Ruhaan and eventually marries the latter. He, however, tells Sargam that until he regains his memory, he will not consummate their marriage. One day, Ruhaan finally remembers everything when he sees his father Naresh. Eventually, Ruhaan returns to Oberoi house with Naresh and Sargam, but remains haunted and tormented by memories of Simran.

Cast 
 Priyamvada Sawant as Simran Ruhaan Oberoi (2007-2008) 
 Gaurav Khanna as Ruhaan Oberoi (2007-2008)
 Nausheen Ali Sardar as Suhana: girlfriend of Ruhaan (Main Antagonist) (2007-2008)
 Geeta Khanna as Mrs. Oberoi
 Vikram Sahu as Naresh Oberoi
 Madhavi Gogate as Madhavi Naresh Oberoi
 Sachin Chhabra as Ruhaan Oberoi (2008)
 Aditi Sajwan as Arpita Oberoi
 Akshat Gupta as Abhishek (Abhi)
 Zeb Khan as Inder (Arpita's husband)
 Seema Pandey as Sandhya Niranjan Oberoi 
 Rajshree Debnath as Sandhya Niranjan Oberoi
 Pankaj Vishnu as Niranjan Oberoi
 Sahil Chauhan as Pinto
 Amreen as Riya 
 Pankaj Berry as Rajveer Malhotra
 Tiya Gandwani as Kiran Rajveer Malhotra
 Shikha Singh as Amrapali
 Poonam Gulati as Shanaya
 Jaskaran Singh as Karan 
 Amita Nangia as Mrs. Saxena 
 Gufi Paintal as Dr Vishal 
 Rahul Lohani as Vedant 
 Gajendra Chauhan as Mahendra 
 Rajeev Verma as Bhargav Dadaji 
 Madhuri Sanjeev as Durga
 Shruti Sharma as Sargam Ruhaan Oberoi
 Kuldeep Chaudhary as Santosh

Crew 
 Director - Yash Chauhan, Manish Jain, Ajit Kumar
 Director Associate - Tanveer Alam, Jitendra Kumar Singh, Sushil Jain
 Director Creative - Kajal shah

External links 
 Official Website
 

2007 Indian television series debuts
2008 Indian television series endings
Indian television soap operas
Zee TV original programming